Sherine Adel (born 19 April 1988), better known as Shery Adel, is an Egyptian actress. She began acting when she was a child in TV advertisements. Her first film role was in Friends or Business in 2001. She then acted in many movies such as: Outlaw in 2007, Hassan and Marcus in 2008, Amer Al-Behar in 2009 and A Bewildered Lovebird in 2010. She also acted in many series such as: King Farouk in 2007 as Narriman Sadek, Unknown Number in 2012, Temporary Name in 2013, and The Sin in 2014. She was labeled as Egyptian cinema chocolate.

Early life
She was born in Cairo, her real name is Sherine Adel, She studied Trade at Ain Shams University. She began to act when she was a child in TV advertisements, before leaving TV and returning to her first role in cinema. She appeared in Friends or business in 2001 with Mostafa Qamar and Amr Waked.

Career
She acted in many main roles such as King Farouk in 2007 which she acted Queen Narriman Sadek with Taim Hasan. Women dont know contrition in 2009, Queen in exile in 2010 as Princess Fathia Ghali with Nadia Al-Gindi, The Citizen x in 2011, Unknown number in 2012, Temporary name in 2013, The sin in 2014 with Sherif Mounir and Reham Abdel Ghafour, Time difference in 2014 with Tamer Hosny and Nicole Saba, The House secrets in 2015 with Hana Shiha, Iblis game in 2015,  Superman's Girls  in 2016 with Yosra El Lozy and Riham Hajaj, Naseeby We Esmetak in 2016–2017 with Hany Salama and Nicole Saba, and The Black horse in 2017 with Ahmed El Sakka.

In movies she had also many main roles such as Hassan and Marcus in 2008 with Adel Emam and Omar Sharif, Ameer Elbehar in 2009 with Mohamed Henedi, A Bewildered Lovebird in 2010 with Ahmed Helmy, Dawlat security in 2011 with Hamada Helal, My woman and wife in 2014 with Ramez Galal, Sukkar mur in 2015 with Ahmed El-Fishawy and Haytham Ahamed Zaki, Where s my heart in 2017 with Mostafa Qamar and Yosra El Lozy.
In 2009, she won Best coming actress award in Alexandria International Film Festival.

Personal life
In July 2018 she celebrated wedding from  producer Moez Masoud, She announced divorce 2019.

Works

Films
 Friends or business in 2001
 Hamada playing in 2005
 Outlaw in 2007
 Hassan and Marcus in 2008
 Klashinkov in 2008
 Ameer Albehar in 2009
 A Bewildered Lovebird in 2010
 Dawlat security in 2011
 My woman and wife in 2014
 Sukkar murr in 2015
 Where s my heart in 2017

Series
 Albaydaa in 2001
 Girl from Shubra in 2004
 The port and sailor in 2005
 One Thousand and One Nights: Salem and Ghanem in 2005
 I want solution in 2005
 Love after agreement in 2006
 The Cindrela in 2006
 Shark demon in 2006
 My life is you in 2006
 Yetraba fe ezo in 2007
 King Farouk in 2007
 Womans heart in 2007
 Soul breeze in 2008
 Right word in 2008
 Night of foxes in 2008
 Women dont know remorse in 2009
 The man and The way in 2009
 Sheikh of Arabs Hamam in 2009
 Ragekl wa set setat 6 in 2010
 A queen in exile in 2010
 Lazem baba yeheb in 2011
 The citizen x in 2011
 Unknown number in 2012
 Bab Al-khalq in 2012
 Temporary name in 2013
 Al Saqar Shaheen in 2013
 Identity proving in 2013
 The sin in 2014
 Time difference in 2014
 ALboyot asrar in 2015
 Iblis game in 2015
  Superman's Girls  in 2016
 Naseeby We Esmetak 1-2 in 2016-2017
 The black horse in 2017
 The rogue arrows in 2018
 Esmo eh in 2019

Stages
 Egypt above all problems in 2014

Hosting
 Musalsaliko in 2013

References

External links
 Shery Adel in IMDb

1988 births
Living people
Actresses from Cairo
21st-century Egyptian actresses
Egyptian film actresses
Egyptian television actresses
Egyptian Muslims
Ain Shams University alumni